Glen Park is an urban park in the Town Centre area of Coquitlam, British Columbia. It contains a picnic area, park trails, playground, ball diamond, and fenced dog park.

Starting in 2012, the 16.7 acre park went through a $508,000 upgrade in part to support all the high density construction going on in the area. During the upgrade the city controversially cut down many trees in the park.

References

Parks in Coquitlam
Urban public parks in Canada